Raboso may refer to:

 San Juan Raboso, Puebla, a town sometimes called Raboso
 Raboso (grape)